Captain Ghulam Ghaus Khan of Rawalpindi District, Pakistan was an Indian freedom fighter belonging to the famous Khatar Khan family of Rawalpindi District.

Early life
Khan was the son of Captain Boota Khan of Rawalpindi and studied at the Indian Military Academy, Dehradun.

Career 
He was commissioned as an officer in the British Indian Army. He joined Indian National Army (INA) with the several British Indian soldiers and took command of Rangoon (Burma). Later, he became the Brigadier and then the Commander Administrator of Rangoon.

Death 
He died on 17 January 2005 in Islamabad Pakistan.

References

2005 deaths
Indian National Army personnel
Year of birth missing
People from Rawalpindi District